Gav Kosh-e Olya (also Romanized as Gāv Kosh-e ‘Olyā; also known as Gāv Kosh and Gāu Kush) is a village in Khaveh-ye Jonubi Rural District, in the Central District of Delfan County, Lorestan Province, Iran. At the 2006 census, its population was 1,836, in 407 families.

References 

Towns and villages in Delfan County